Prix d'Amérique is a harness race held at the Hippodrome de Vincennes in Paris, France. The race takes place on the last Sunday of January every year, and has been doing so since 1920, with the exception for the years 1940-1941 when it was cancelled due to World War II. It was established to thank the US for the help given to France in World War I. It is widely considered the most prestigious harness race in the world.

Champions 
 1920 Pro Patria (Th. Monsieur)
 1921 Pro Patria (Th. Monsieur)
 1922 Reynolds V (M. Gougeon)
 1923 Passeport (P. Viel)
 1924 Passeport (Alexandre Finn)
 1925 Re Mac Gregor (C. Dessauze)
 1926 Uranie (V. Capovilla)
 1927 Uranie (V. Capovilla)
 1928 Uranie (V. Capovilla)
 1929 Templier (A. Butti)
 1930 Amazone B (Th. Vanlandeghem)
 1931 Hazleton (Otto Dieffenbacher)
 1932 Hazleton (Otto Dieffenbacher)
 1933 Amazone B (Th. Vanlandeghem)
 1934 Walter Dear (Charlie Mills)
 1935 Muscletone (Alexandre Finn)
 1936 Javari (M. Perlbag)
 1937 Muscletone (Alexandre Finn)
 1938 De Sota (Alexandre Finn)
 1939 De Sota (Alexandre Finn)
 1940 Race cancelled
 1941 Race cancelled
 1942 Neulisse (C. Domergue)
 1943 Nebuleuse V (R. Simonard)
 1944 Profane (A. Sourroubille)
 1945 Ovidius Naso (Roger Céran-Maillard)
 1946 Ovidius Naso (Roger Céran-Maillard)
 1947 Mistero (Romolo Ossani)
 1948 Mighty Ned (V. Antonellini)
 1949 Venutar (F. Réaud)
 1950 Scotch Fez (Sören Nordin)
 1951 Mighty Ned (Alexandre Finn)
 1952 Cancannière (Jonel Chryriacos)
 1953 Permit (Walter Heitmann)
 1954 Feu Follet X (M. Riaud)
 1955 Fortunato II (Roger Céran-Maillard)
 1956 Gélinotte (Roger Céran-Maillard)
 1957 Gélinotte (Roger Céran-Maillard)
 1958 Jamin (Jean Riaud)
 1959 Jamin (Jean Riaud)
 1960 Hairos II (Willem Geersen)
 1961 Masina (François Brohier)
 1962 Newstar (Walter Baroncini)
 1963 Ozo (Roger Massue)
 1964 Nike Hanover (Jan Frömming)
 1965 Ozo (Jan Frömming)
 1966 Roquépine (Jean-René Gougeon)
 1967 Roquépine (Henri Lévesque)
 1968 Roquépine (Jean-René Gougeon)
 1969 Upsalin (Louis Sauvé)
 1970 Toscan (Michel-Marcel Gougeon)
 1971 Tidalium Pélo (Jean Mary)
 1972 Tidalium Pélo (Jean Mary)
 1973 Dart Hanover (Berndt Lindtstedt)
 1974 Delmonica Hanover (F. Frömming)
 1975 Bellino II (Jean-René Gougeon)
 1976 Bellino II (Jean-René Gougeon)
 1977 Bellino II (Jean-René Gougeon)
 1978 Grandpré (Pierre-Désiré Allaire)
 1979 High Echelon (Jean-Pierre Dubois)
 1980 Eléazar (Léopold Verroken)
 1981 Idéal du Gazeau (Eugène Lefèvre)
 1982 Hymour (Jean-Pierre Dubois)
 1983 Idéal du Gazeau (Eugène Lefèvre)
 1984 Lurabo (Michel-Marcel Gougeon)
 1985 Lutin d'Isigny (Jean-Paul André)

 1986 Ourasi (Jean-René Gougeon)
 1987 Ourasi (Jean-René Gougeon)
 1988 Ourasi (Jean-René Gougeon)
 1989 Queila Gédé (Roger Baudron)
 1990 Ourasi (Michel-Marcel Gougeon)
 1991 Ténor de Baune (Jean-Baptiste Bossuet)
 1992 Verdict Gédé (Jean-Claude Hallais)
 1993 Queen L. (Stig H. Johansson)
 1994 Sea Cove (Jos Verbeeck)
 1995 Ina Scot (Helen Johansson)
 1996 Cocktail Jet  (Jean-Etienne Dubois)
 1997 Abo Volo (Jos Verbeeck)
 1998 Dryade des Bois (Jos Verbeeck)
 1999 Moni Maker (Jean-Michel Bazire)
 2000 Général du Pommeau (Jules Lepennetier)
 2001 Varenne (Giampaolo Minnucci)
 2002 Varenne (Giampaolo Minnucci)
 2003 Abano As (Jos Verbeeck)
 2004 Kesaco Phedo (Jean-Michel Bazire)
 2005 Jag de Bellouet (Christophe Gallier)
 2006 Gigant Neo (Dominik Locqueneux)
 2007 Offshore Dream (Pierre Levesque)
 2008 Offshore Dream (Pierre Levesque)
 2009 Meaulnes du Corta (Franck Nivard) 
 2010 Oyonnax (Sebastien Ernault)
 2011 Ready Cash (Franck Nivard) 
 2012 Ready Cash (Franck Nivard)
 2013 Royal Dream (Jean-Philippe Dubois)
 2014 Maharajah (Örjan Kihlström)
 2015 Up And Quick (Jean-Michel Bazire)
 2016 Bold Eagle (Franck Nivard)
 2017 Bold Eagle (Franck Nivard)
 2018 Readly Express (Björn Goop)
 2019 Bélina Josselyn (Jean-Michel Bazire)
 2020 Face Time Bourbon (Björn Goop)
 2021 Face Time Bourbon (Björn Goop)
 2022 Davidson du Pont (Nicolas Bazire)
 2023 Hooker Berry (Jean-Michel Bazire)

References

External links
 Official Website - English version
 2009 edition second by second video and winner position with Meaulnes du Corta on Kinomap

1920 establishments in France
Harness races in France
January sporting events
Recurring sporting events established in 1920